Tongoloa is a genus of flowering plants belonging to the family Apiaceae.

Its native range is Himalaya to China.

Species:
 Tongoloa dunnii (H.Boissieu) H.Wolff 
 Tongoloa elata H.Wolff

References

Apioideae